Carlos Jerónimo (born August 31, 1990, in Xonacatlán, Mexico) is a Mexican professional footballer who plays for Atlante of Liga MX.

External links
 Ascenso MX

Liga MX players
Association footballers not categorized by position
Living people
1990 births
Footballers from the State of Mexico
21st-century Mexican people
Mexican footballers